Kalashi-ye Nahang (also Romanized as Kalāshī-ye Nahang; also known as Kalāsh-e Nahang, Nahang, and Nehang) is a village in Khaneh Shur Rural District, in the Central District of Salas-e Babajani County, Kermanshah Province, Iran. At the 2006 census, its population was 217, in 49 families.

References 

Populated places in Salas-e Babajani County